The University of South Dakota at Springfield was a state supported university in Springfield, South Dakota that was founded in 1881 and closed in 1984.  It started as Southern State Normal School, became Southern State Teachers College in 1947, Southern State College in 1964, and finally the University of South Dakota at Springfield in 1971.

The campus is now home to Mike Durfee State Prison, which is named for a star athlete and teacher at the school.

Mel Tjeerdsma, a national championship-winning football coach at Northwest Missouri State University and 2006 president of the American Football Coaches Association, is an alumnus.  

The school mascot was the Pointer.

References

 
Educational institutions established in 1881
Educational institutions disestablished in 1984
1881 establishments in Dakota Territory